The 2013–14 Azerbaijan Premier League is the 22nd season of Azerbaijan Premier League, the Azerbaijani professional league for association football clubs, since its establishment in 1992. Neftchi Baku are the defending champions, having won the previous season.

Teams

Kəpəz and Turan were relegated from the 2012–13 Azerbaijan Premier League.

The format of the league will change as a total of 10 teams will contest the league, with the last two clubs relegated and no teams promoted from the first division. The competition format follows the usual double round-robin format. During the course of a season, which lasts from August to May, each club plays every other club four times, twice at home and twice away, for a total of 36 games.

As of this season, PFL announced that each player will have to wear not only the number, but also his name on the back of the jersey.

Stadia and locations
''Note: Table lists in alphabetical order.

Personnel and kits

Note: Flags indicate national team as has been defined under FIFA eligibility rules. Players may hold more than one non-FIFA nationality.

Managerial changes

League table

Results

Games 1–18

Games 19–36

Season statistics

Scoring
 First goal of the season: Mindaugas Kalonas for Baku against Gabala (2 August 2013)
 Fastest goal of the season: 2nd minute, 
Ernest Nfor for Neftchi Baku against Baku (10 November 2013)
 Latest goal of the season: 94 minutes, 
Shahriyar Rahimov for AZAL against Ravan Baku (8 December 2013)  Mahir Shukurov for Neftchi Baku against Gabala (15 December 2013) 
 Largest winning margin: 5 goals
Baku 5–0 Ravan Baku (18 August 2013)
 Highest scoring game: 7 goals
Qarabağ 4–3 Gabala (3 November 2013) 
 Most goals scored in a match by a single team: 5 goals
Qarabağ 5–1 Sumgayit (11 August 2013)
Baku 5–0 Ravan Baku (18 August August 2013)
Ravan Baku 1–5 Inter Baku (25 August 2013)
 Most goals scored in a match by a losing team: 2 goals
Gabala 3–2 Inter Baku (3 August 2013)

Top scorers

Hat-tricks

Clean sheets
 Most clean sheets: 18
Qarabağ
 Fewest clean sheets: 4
Sumgayit

Discipline

Player
 Most yellow cards: 16
Aleksandr Shemonayev (AZAL)
 Most red cards: 3
Elvin Yunuszade (Neftchi Baku)
Ilkin Qirtimov (Simurq)

Club
 Most yellow cards: 112
Ravan Baku
 Most red cards: 13
Neftchi Baku

Awards

Monthly awards

Last updated: 11 November 2013
Source: Azerbaijan Premier League

PFL Team of the Year

The PFL team of the year was:	
Goalkeeper: Giorgi Lomaia (Inter)
Defence: Bruno Bertucci (Neftchi), Mahir Shukurov (Neftchi), Denis Silva (Neftchi), Yohan Bocognano (Inter)
Midfield: David Meza (Inter), Richard Almeida (Qarabağ), Leroy George (Qarabağ), Chumbinho (Qarabağ)
Attack: Reynaldo (Qarabağ), Ernest Nfor (Neftchi)

See also
 2013–14 Azerbaijan Cup
 2013 Azerbaijan Supercup

References 

2013–14 in European association football leagues
2013-14
1